Demirce is a village in the Nazımiye District, Tunceli Province, Turkey. The village is populated by Kurds of the Arel tribe and had a population of 27 in 2021.

The hamlets of Başoluk, Gölgelik, Soğumeşe and Tavuklu are attached to the village.

References 

Villages in Nazımiye District
Kurdish settlements in Tunceli Province